Tanaoctena indubitata is a moth in the family Galacticidae. It was described by Clarke in 1971. It is found in French Polynesia (Rapa Iti).

References

Moths described in 1971
Galacticidae